Dele Olorundare (born 1 December 1990 in Akure, Nigeria) is a Nigerian football player who plays for Sunshine Stars F.C. He was the leading highest goal scorer in the NIgeria premier league 2013 season first leg with 13 goals in 23 games before joining the TKİ Tavşanlı Linyitspor on loan deal. Besides Nigeria, he has played in Turkey.

Career

References

External links

http://www.goal.com/en-ng/people/nigeria/73711/dele-olorundare
http://www.nigeriafootball.com/playerInfo,227,Dele-Olorundare

1990 births
Living people
Nigerian footballers
Nigerian expatriate footballers
Expatriate footballers in Turkey
Nigerian expatriate sportspeople in Turkey
Yoruba sportspeople
People from Akure
Association football forwards
Sunshine Stars F.C. players
TKİ Tavşanlı Linyitspor footballers